The Night is the fifth and final studio album by the alternative rock band Morphine, released in 2000 via DreamWorks. The album expands the band's sound beyond their usual arrangements of previous albums (bass, saxophone and drums), introducing acoustic guitars, organs, strings and female backing vocals.

The album peaked at No. 137 on the Billboard 200.

Production
Jerome Deupree, the band's original drummer, who had previously quit due to health problems, rejoined as a guest playing alongside Billy Conway, according to credits listed in the CD booklet, thus making The Night Morphine's first album recorded as a quartet rather than a trio. Recording sessions for the album were completed shortly before the sudden July 1999 death of bass player and lead singer Mark Sandman; Conway and saxophonist Dana Colley oversaw the final mixing process. The band spent two years working on the album in Sandman's Cambridge home studio.

Critical reception
The Pitch wrote that "it’s not a romantic exaggeration to say that this album is the trio’s most sensuous, satisfying recording, finally delivering on the diverting-but-two-dimensional original notion of what Sandman termed 'low rock' ... The Night is the first time in ages a posthumous release has made noise from beyond the grave that doesn’t sound like a cash register." Trouser Press wrote that "the tone may be dour due to the singer’s sudden death, but the music is the most fully realized and finely textured Morphine ever mustered." Exclaim! called the album "a slow, grinding burlesque that hovers tentatively between testifying to above and wallowing down below."

Track listing

All songs written by Mark Sandman.

 "The Night" – 4:50
 "So Many Ways" – 4:01
 "Souvenir" – 4:40  
 "Top Floor, Bottom Buzzer" – 5:44
 "Like a Mirror" – 5:26
 "A Good Woman is Hard to Find" – 4:14
 "Rope on Fire" – 5:36
 "I'm Yours, You're Mine" – 3:46
 "The Way We Met" – 2:59
 "Slow Numbers" – 3:58
 "Take Me with You" – 4:54

Personnel
Adapted from the album liner notes.

Morphine
Mark Sandman – vocals, 2-string slide bass, acoustic guitar, piano, organ, trombone, tritar
Dana Colley – baritone saxophone, tenor saxophone, bass saxophone, piano, backing vocals, 
Billy Conway – drums, percussion, backing vocals

Additional musicians
Jerome Deupree – drums (1–8, 10, 11)
Jane Scarpantoni – cello (1, 7, 11)
Mike Rivard – double bass (7, 11)
John Medeski – organ (4, 8) 
Billy Beard – hand drum (7)
Brahim Fribgane – oud, frame drum (7)
Joseph Kessler – viola (7, 11)
Carolyn Kaylor – backing vocals (2, 4) 
Linda Viens – backing vocals (2, 4) 
Ramona Clifton – backing vocals (4) 
Margaret Garrett – backing vocals (5) 
Tara McManus – backing vocals (5)

Technical
Mark Sandman – producer, engineer (Hi-N-Dry)
Morphine – producer, art direction
Brian Dunton – engineer (Hi-N-Dry)
Matthew Ellard – engineer (Hi-N-Dry)
Juan Garcia – engineer (Magic Shop)
Reto Peter – engineer (Magic Shop)
Dave Kay – engineer (Super Sonic)
Toby Mountain – mastering 
Robert Fisher – design

Charts

References

2000 albums
DreamWorks Records albums
Morphine (band) albums
Albums published posthumously